Lysimachus (Greek: Λυσίμαχος, Lysimachos; c. 360 BC – 281 BC) was a Thessalian officer and successor of Alexander the Great, who in 306 BC, became King of Thrace, Asia Minor and Macedon.

Early life and career

Lysimachus was born in circa 360 BC, to a family of Thessalian stock but they were citizens of Pella in Macedonia. He was the second son of Agathocles and his wife; there is some indication in the historical sources that this wife was perhaps named Arsinoe, and that Lysimachus' paternal grandfather may have been called Alcimachus. His father was a nobleman of high rank who was an intimate friend of Philip II of Macedon, who shared in Philip II’s councils and became a favourite in the Argead court. Lysimachus and his brothers grew up with the status of Macedonians; all these brothers enjoyed with Lysimachus prominent positions in Alexander’s circle and, like him, were educated at the Macedonian court in Pella.

The historian Justin relates the story that Lysimachus smuggled poison to a person Alexander had condemned to a slow death and was himself thrown to a lion as punishment, but overcame the beast with his bare hands and became one of Alexander's favorites. Pausanias writes that Lysimachus was one of Alexander's body-guards, whom Alexander once in anger shut up in a chamber with a lion but he killed the lion and after that Alexander treated him with respect, and honored him as much as the noblest Macedonians. 

Some coins issued during Lysimachus's appointment had his image on one side and a lion on the other.

He was probably appointed Somatophylax during the reign of Philip II. During Alexander's Persian campaigns, in 328 BC he was one of his immediate bodyguards. In 324 BC, in Susa, he was awarded a ceremonial crown in recognition of his actions in India. After Alexander's death in 323 BC, he was appointed to the government of Thrace as strategos although he faced some difficulties from the Thracian king Seuthes.

Diadochi

In 315 BC, Lysimachus joined Cassander, Ptolemy and Seleucus against Antigonus, who, however, diverted his attention by stirring up Thracian and Scythian tribes against him. However, he managed to consolidate his power in the east of his territories, suppressing a revolt of the cities on the Black Sea coast.

In 309 BC, he founded Lysimachia in a commanding situation on the neck connecting the Chersonese with the mainland, forming a bulwark against the Odrysians.

In 306/305 BC, Lysimachus followed the example of Antigonus and assumed the royal title.

In 302 BC, when the second alliance between Cassander, Ptolemy and Seleucus was made, Lysimachus, reinforced by troops from Cassander, entered Asia Minor, where he met with little resistance. On the approach of Antigonus he retired into winter quarters near Heraclea, marrying its widowed queen Amastris, a Persian princess. Seleucus joined him in 301 BC, and at the Battle of Ipsus Antigonus was defeated and slain.  Antigonus' dominions were divided among the victors. Lysimachus' share was Lydia, Ionia, Phrygia and the north coast of Asia Minor.

Feeling that Seleucus was becoming dangerously powerful, Lysimachus now allied himself with Ptolemy, marrying his daughter Arsinoe II of Egypt. Amastris, who had divorced herself from him, returned to Heraclea. When Antigonus' son Demetrius I renewed hostilities (297 BC), during his absence in Greece, Lysimachus seized his towns in Asia Minor, but in 294 BC concluded a peace whereby Demetrius was recognized as ruler of Macedonia. He tried to carry his power beyond the Danube, but was defeated and taken prisoner by the Getae king Dromichaetes (or Dromihete), who, however, set him free in 292 BC on amicable terms in return for  Lysimachus surrendering the Danubian lands he had captured. Demetrius subsequently threatened Thrace, but had to retire due to a sudden uprising in Boeotia and an attack from King Pyrrhus of Epirus.

In 287 BC, Lysimachus and Pyrrhus in turn invaded Macedonia and drove Demetrius out of the country. Lysimachus left Pyrrhus in possession of Macedonia with the title of king for around seven months before Lysimachus invaded. For a short while the two ruled jointly but in 285 BC Lysimachus expelled Pyrrhus, seizing complete control for himself.

Later years
Domestic troubles embittered the last years of Lysimachus’ life. Amastris had been murdered by her two sons; Lysimachus treacherously put them to death. On his return, Arsinoe II asked the gift of Heraclea, and he granted her request, though he had promised to free the city. In 284 BC Arsinoe, desirous of gaining the succession for her sons in preference to Lysimachus’ first child, Agathocles, intrigued against him with the help of Arsinoe's paternal half-brother Ptolemy Keraunos; they accused him of conspiring with Seleucus to seize the throne, and Agathocles was put to death.

This atrocious deed by Lysimachus aroused great indignation. Many of the cities of Asia Minor revolted, and his most trusted friends deserted him. The widow of Agathocles and their children fled to Seleucus, who at once invaded the territory of Lysimachus in Asia Minor. In 281 BC, Lysimachus crossed the Hellespont into Lydia and at the decisive Battle of Corupedium was killed. After some days his body was found on the field, protected from birds of prey by his faithful dog. Lysimachus' body was given over to another son, Alexander, by whom it was interred at Lysimachia.

Marriages and children
Lysimachus was married three times and his wives were:
 First marriage: Nicaea, a Greek (Macedonian) noblewoman and daughter of the powerful Regent Antipater. Lysimachus and Nicaea married in c. 321 BC. Nicaea bore Lysimachus three children:
 Son, Agathocles
 Daughter, Eurydice
 Daughter, Arsinoe I
Nicaea most probably died by 302 BC. 
 Second marriage: Persian Princess Amastris. Lysimachus married her in 302 BC. Amastris and Lysimachus’ union was brief, as he ended their marriage and divorced her in 300/299 BC. 
 Third marriage: Ptolemaic Greek Princess Arsinoe II. Arsinoe II married Lysimachus in 300/299 BC and remained with him until his death in 281 BC. Arsinoe II bore Lysimachus three sons:
 Ptolemy I Epigonos
 Lysimachus
 Philip
From an Odrysian concubine he had a son borne to him called Alexander.

Family tree of Lysimachids

See also
Belevi Mausoleum

References

Bibliography

Primary sources

Secondary sources
Hunerwadel, Forschungen zur Gesch. des Könige Lysimachus (1900)
Possenti, Il Re Lisimaco di Tracia (1901)
Ghione, "Note sul regno di Lisimaco" Atti d. real. Accad. di Torino xxxix (1903)
 R.A. Billows, Kings and colonists: aspects of Macedonian imperialism, BRILL, 1995
 H.S. Lund, Lysimachus: A Study in Early Hellenistic Kingship, Routledge, 2002
 W. Heckel, Who’s who in the age of Alexander the Great: prosopography of Alexander’s empire, Wiley-Blackwell, 2006
 Lysimachus’ article at Livius.org
 Ptolemaic Genealogy: Ptolemy Ceraunus
 Ptolemaic Genealogy: Unknown wife of Ptolemy Ceraunus
 Ptolemaic Genealogy: Ptolemy ‘the Son’

External links

Lysimachus
Lysimachus' Dog & Nisaean Horses – Informative but non-scholarly essay on Lysimachus (Annotated with Sources)

360s BC births
281 BC deaths
4th-century BC Macedonians
3rd-century BC Macedonian monarchs
3rd-century BC rulers
4th-century BC rulers
Ancient Greeks killed in battle
Ancient Macedonian generals
Ancient Pellaeans
Ancient Thessalians
Deaths by javelin
Hellenistic generals
Hellenistic Macedonia
Hellenistic rulers
Hellenistic Thrace
Ancient Macedonian monarchs
Ancient Macedonian monarchs killed in battle
Non-dynastic kings of Macedonia (ancient kingdom)
Satraps of the Alexandrian Empire
Somatophylakes
Trierarchs of Nearchus' fleet